The Waterford Minor Football Championship is a Gaelic football competition played by GAA teams in Waterford in Ireland. All players have to be under the age of 18 in the year in which they take part here. The competition is organized by the two divisions of Waterford GAA county board - East Division and West Division. The clubs will first play in the divisional competition with the winners of each playing in the county final.

Roll of honour

References

http://www.chillok.net/cmore/?p=11
http://www.munster-express.ie/sports/gaa-football/champions-nire-hard-pressed-to-retain-title/

5